Pionopsis is a genus of mites belonging to the family Pionidae.

The species of this genus are found in Europe and Northern America.

Species:
 Pionopsis fragilis Habeeb, 1954 
 Pionopsis latilamellis Marshall, 1924 
 Pionopsis lutescens (Hermann, 1804)

References

Trombidiformes
Trombidiformes genera